Aram Khachaturian's Violin Concerto in D minor is a violin concerto in three movements composed in 1940. It was composed for David Oistrakh and was premiered on 16 November 1940 by Oistrakh.

Composition
In 1940, Khachaturian was enjoying tremendous professional success and personal joy. He worked on the concerto in the tranquility of a wood composer's retreat west of Moscow; he said of the composition that he "worked without effort ... Themes came to me in such abundance that I had a hard time putting them in order."  Many sections of the concerto are reminiscent of the folk music of Khachaturian's native Armenia—while he never directly quotes a specific folk melody, "the exotic Oriental flavor of Armenian scales and melodies and the captivating rhythmic diversity of dances" are throughout the work.  The work has been charactered by "an exhilarating rhythmic drive and vitality, and a penchant  for intoxicating, highly flavored, languorous melody owing much to the inflections of his native Armenian folk music." Having won the Stalin prize in 1941, it has since become one of Khachaturian's famous pieces, in spite of considerable criticism.

Structure

Violin concerto in D minor (1940)
 First movement: Allegro con fermezza (about 14 minutes) 
 Second movement: Andante sostenuto (about 12 minutes)
 Third movement: Allegro vivace (about 9 minutes)

A movement in sonata form, the Allegro con fermezza opens with a melody that has been described as "energetic" a "rollicking dance-like theme," and this yields to a "more lyrical" secondary melody.

The Andante sostenuto has been described as "a rhapsodic slow movement that sweeps one into a brooding wintry landscape." Geoffrey Norris wrote, "The ease and spontaneity, pungency and flexibility of Khachaturian's melodic inventions are most clearly laid out in the Andante sostenuto of the central movement, cast in a free-flowing, quasi-improvisatory manner redolent of the art of Armenian folk music." The second movement is a free-flowing rondo.

The concluding Allegro vivace has been called "a whirlwind of motion and virtuosity." In this movement, "the folks element is specially pronounced in the dance-like vigor of the main melody and in the repetitive, insistent, wild virtuosity of the solo instrument."

Discography

References

Compositions by Aram Khachaturian
1940 compositions
Khachaturian
Compositions in D minor